Saul Bernard Cohen (28 July 1925 – 9 June 2021) was an American human geographer.

Cohen graduated from Harvard University just before the faculty closed its Department of Geography (1947–1951). He was President Emeritus of the Queens College and was Professor of Geography at the Hunter College in New York and Clark University In Massachusetts.

Publications 
Israel's Fishing Industry. In: Geog Rev, 1957.  
With Gordon B. Turner. Naval War College Review, vol. X, no. 4, December 1957 
As editor. New approaches in introductory college geography courses. Association of American Geographers Comm College Geog, 1967. 
Geography and Politics in a World Divided, 1963.  (2nd ed.)
Geography and the Environment. Voice of America Forum Lectures, 1968. 
As geographic editor. Oxford World Atlas. Oxford University Press, 1973. 
Jerusalem: Bridging the Four Walls, a Geopolitical Perspective. Herzl Press, 1977. 
The Geopolitics of Israel's Border Question (Jcss Study, No.7). Westview Press, 1987. 
Reflections on the Elimination of Geography at Harvard, 1947-51. In: Annals of the American Association of Geographers, 78, 1, 1988, p. 148-151.
Columbia Gazetteer of the World Volume 1. Columbia University Press, 1998. 
Strategic Geography and the Changing Middle East.(Review): An article from: The Geographical Review. In: The Geographical Review, 1998, vol. 88, issue 1, p. 168(3).
Textbooks that moved generations: Whittlesey, D. 1939: The earth and the state: a study of political geography. New York: Henry Holt and Company. In: Progress in Human Geography, 2002, 26, p. 679. 
 ''Geopolitics: The Geography of International Relations', 3rd edn., 2015.

References

Further reading
Thomas F. Glick. Before the revolution: Edward Ullman and the crisis of geography at Harvard, 1949-1950.

1925 births
2021 deaths
American geographers
Harvard University alumni
Queens College, City University of New York faculty
Hunter College faculty
Presidents of the American Association of Geographers
People from Malden, Massachusetts
Presidents of Queens College, City University of New York